Women's hammer throw competition at the 1997 Summer Universiade took place on August 29, 1997 in Catania, Italy. The event was contested for the first time at the Summer Universiade.

Medalists

Results

Qualification

Final

See also
1997 Hammer Throw Year Ranking

References
 hammerthrow.wz.cz
 FISU

Athletics at the 1997 Summer Universiade
1997 in women's athletics
1997